The 2021 Big Ten conference football season was the 126th season of college football play for the Big Ten Conference and part of the 2021 NCAA Division I FBS football season. This was the Big Ten's eighth season with 14 teams. The league's champion was Michigan.

With a win on November 26 over Nebraska, and a loss by Wisconsin on November 27, Iowa won the Big Ten West division. With a win over Ohio State on November 27 Michigan clinched a share of the Big Ten East division championship and a spot in the Big Ten Championship game against Iowa on December 4 at Lucas Oil Stadium.

Nine Big Ten teams were bowl-eligible at the completion of the regular season: Iowa, Maryland, Michigan (CFP), Michigan State, Minnesota, Ohio State, Penn State, Purdue, and Wisconsin. A tenth, Rutgers, was added by NCAA contingency plans on December 23 as Texas A&M withdrew from the Gator Bowl, and with no bowl eligible teams available, the NCAA chose their replacement using Academic Progress Rate regulations.

Previous season
The COVID-19 pandemic led to the 2020 season originally being canceled. However, after an agreed-upon testing regimen was developed and the fact that many other major college conferences continued their seasons, the conference reinstated the season. The season was delayed to the end of October with no non-conference games to be played. The conference settled on an eight-game conference-only regular season, beginning on October 23, along with a ninth cross-over week of contests the week of the conference championship game.

Ohio State won the East Division title and made their sixth appearance in the Big Ten Championship Game and fourth consecutive appearance. In the West Division, Northwestern won the division title. In that championship game, Ohio State defeated Northwestern 22–10 to win their fourth consecutive Big Ten championship. With that win, the Buckeyes landed a spot in the 2020–21 College Football Playoff as the No. 3 seed. The Buckeyes defeated No. 2 Clemson in the Sugar Bowl (national semifinal) before losing to top-seeded Alabama in the national championship game in Miami.

Five teams qualified for bowl games in the 2020 season, however Iowa's Music City Bowl matchup with Missouri was canceled due to COVID-19. The Big Ten went 3–2 in its postseason games.

Coaching changes 
Illinois hired former Arkansas and Wisconsin head coach Bret Bielema to serve as head coach, replacing Lovie Smith who was fired during the 2020 season.

Preseason

Recruiting classes

Big Ten Media Days

Preseason Media Poll
Below are the results of the preseason media poll with total points received next to each school and first-place votes in parentheses. For the 2021 poll, Ohio State was voted as the favorite to win both the East Division and the Big Ten Championship Game. This is the 11th iteration of the preseason media poll conducted by Cleveland.com, which polls at least one credentialed media member for each Big Ten team. Only three times in the last 11 years has the media accurately predicted the Big Ten champion.

Preseason awards
Below are the results of the annual Preseason Big Ten Player of the Year awards conducted by Cleveland.com.

Rankings

Schedule

All times Eastern time.

† denotes Homecoming game

Regular season schedule

Week 0

Week 1

Week 2

Week 3

Week 4

Week 5

Week 6

Week 7

Week 8

Week 9

Week 10

Week 11

Week 12

Week 13

Big Ten Championship Game

Postseason

Bowl games

For the 2020–2025 bowl cycle, The Big Ten will have annually eight appearances in the following bowls: Rose Bowl (unless they are selected for playoffs filled by a Pac-12 team if champion is in the playoffs), Citrus Bowl, Guaranteed Rate Bowl, Las Vegas Bowl, Music City Bowl, Pinstripe Bowl, Quick Lane Bowl, and Outback Bowl. The Big Ten teams will go to a New Year's Six bowl if a team finishes higher than the champions of Power Five conferences in the final College Football Playoff rankings. The Big Ten champion is also eligible for the College Football Playoff if it's among the top four teams in the final CFP ranking.

On December 22, Texas A&M withdrew from the Gator Bowl, citing a breakout of positive COVID-19 cases and season-ending injuries limiting them to few players.  On December 23, the NCAA football oversight committee approved Rutgers as the first bowl alternate, under rules where five-win teams are calculated by Academic Progress Rate calculations.  Rutgers finished first in APR among the five-win schools and was given the offer to accept the bid.  The NCAA also allowed the game to be postponed as late as January 10 in order to allow any replacement teams time.

Rankings are from AP Poll.  All times Eastern Time Zone.

Big Ten records vs other conferences

2021–2022 records against non-conference foes:

Post Season

Awards and honors

Player of the week honors

Big Ten Individual Awards

The following individuals won the conference's annual player and coach awards:

Individual awards

All-Conference Teams

2021 Big Ten All-Conference Teams and Awards

Coaches Honorable Mention: ILLINOIS: Sydney Brown, Owen Carney, Vederian Lowe, Alex Palczewski; INDIANA: Matthew Bedford, Peyton Hendershot; IOWA: Tyler Goodson, Jack Koerner, Mason Richman, Noah Shannon, Tory Taylor; MARYLAND: Jakorian Bennett, Dontay Demus, Jaelyn Duncan, Ami Finau, Rakim Jarrett, Chigoziem Okonkwo, Taulia Tagovailoa; MICHIGAN: Erick All, Christopher Hinton Jr., Trevor Keegan, Josh Ross, Brad Robbins, Luke Schoonmaker, Mazi Smith, D. J. Turner, Andrew Vastardis; MICHIGAN STATE: Matt Allen, Quavaris Crouch, Xavier Henderson, Connor Heyward, Jarrett Horst, Kevin Jarvis, Jacob Slade, Payton Thorne; MINNESOTA: Ko Kieft, Esezi Otomewo, Sam Schlueter, Mariano Sori-Marin; NEBRASKA: Damion Daniels, Marquel Dismuke, Adrian Martinez, Luke Reimer, Ben Stille, Deontai Williams; NORTHWESTERN: Adetomiwa Adebawore, A. J. Hampton, Evan Hull, Brandon Joseph, Cameron Mitchell; OHIO STATE: Sevyn Banks, Cam Brown, Emeka Egbuka, Antwuan Jackson, Jeremy Ruckert; PENN STATE: Tariq Castro-Fields, Sean Clifford, Jesse Luketa, Juice Scruggs, Rasheed Walker; PURDUE: Jaylan Alexander, Cam Allen, Branson Deen, Payne Durham, Mitchell Fineran, Jalen Graham, Greg Long, Dedrick Mackey, Tyler Witt, Milton Wright; RUTGERS: Olakunle Fatukasi, Isiah Pacheco, Julius Turner; WISCONSIN: Noah Burks, Nick Herbig, Faion Hicks, Isiah Mullens, Jack Nelson, Scott Nelson, Joe Tippmann, Collin Wilder.

Media Honorable Mention: ILLINOIS: Sydney Brown, Owen Carney, Blake Hayes, Doug Kramer, Vederian Lowe, James McCourt, Johnny Newton, Alex Palczewski, Keith Randolph, Devon Witherspoon; INDIANA: Ryder Anderson, Matthew Bedford, Ty Fryfogle, Jaylin Williams; IOWA: Seth Benson, Jack Koerner, Sam LaPorta, Mason Richman, Noah Shannon, Tory Taylor; MARYLAND: Spencer Anderson, Jakorian Bennett, Nick Cross, Ami Finau, Rakim Jarrett, Jordan Mosley, Chigoziem Okonkwo, Sam Okuayinonu, Taulia Tagovailoa; MICHIGAN: Erick All, Blake Corum, Ryan Hayes, Christopher Hinton Jr., Trevor Keegan, Brad Robbins, Luke Schoonmaker, Mazi Smith, D. J. Turner; MICHIGAN STATE: Matt Allen, A. J. Arcuri, Blake Bueter, Matt Coghlin, Quavaris Crouch, J. D. Duplain, Cal Haladay, Connor Heyward, Jarrett Horst, Kevin Jarvis, Jalen Nailor, Darius Snow, Payton Thorne; MINNESOTA: Chris Autman-Bell, Jack Gibbens, Ko Kieft, Tyler Nubin, Conner Olson, Esezi Otomewo, Sam Schlueter, Mariano Sori-Marin; NEBRASKA: Damion Daniels, Cam Jurgens, Luke Reimer, Ben Stille, Samori Toure, Deontai Williams; NORTHWESTERN: Adetomiwa Adebawore, A. J. Hampton, Evan Hull; OHIO STATE: Sevyn Banks, Cam Brown, Denzel Burke, Steele Chambers, Emeka Egbuka, Tommy Eichenberg, Antwuan Jackson, Matthew Jones, Jeremy Ruckert, Bryson Shaw, Taron Vincent, Tyliek Williams, Luke Wypler; PENN STATE: Ellis Brooks, Ji'Ayir Brown, Tariq Castro-Fields, Sean Clifford, Jahan Dotson, Curtis Jacobs, Mike Miranda, P. J. Mustipher, Joey Porter Jr., Juice Scruggs, Brandon Smith, Jordan Stout, Brenton Strange; PURDUE: Jaylan Alexander, Cam Allen, Branson Deen, Mitchell Fineran, Jalen Graham, Gus Hartwig, Tyler Witt, Milton Wright; RUTGERS: Christian Izien, Isiah Pacheco, Julius Turner; WISCONSIN: Tyler Beach, Keeanu Benton, Noah Burks, Nick Herbig, Faion Hicks, Chez Mellusi, Isiah Mullens, Jack Nelson, Scott Nelson, Joe Tippmann, Collin Wilder, Caesar Williams.

Home attendance

2022 NFL Draft

Trades
In the explanations below, (PD) indicates trades completed prior to the start of the draft (i.e. Pre-Draft), while (D) denotes trades that took place during the 2022 draft.

Round one

Round two

Round three

Round four

Round five

Round six

Round seven

Head coaches

* Bret Bielema coached in the Big Ten from 2006 through 2012 at Wisconsin, going 37-19 in Big Ten play and winning three Big Ten championships.

* Tom Allen was hired to replace Kevin Wilson in December 2016 at Indiana and coached the Hoosiers in their 2016 bowl game, going 0–1.

* Mike Locksley served as interim head coach at Maryland in 2015 and coached for six games, going 1–5.

* Ryan Day served as interim head coach at Ohio State for the first three games of the 2018 season while Urban Meyer served a three-game suspension and went 3–0.

* Greg Schiano served as head coach at Rutgers from 2001 through 2011 then left for the NFL. Following the conclusion of the 2019 season, Schiano returned to Rutgers for his second stint as head coach. The Scarlet Knights competed in the Big East Conference in his previous stay at the school.

References